The 2003–04 OPJHL season is the 11th season of the Ontario Provincial Junior A Hockey League (OPJHL). The thirty-five teams of the North, South, East, and West divisions competed in a 49-game schedule.

Come February, the top eight teams of each division competed for the Frank L. Buckland Trophy, the OPJHL championship.  The winner of the Buckland Cup, the Aurora Tigers, went on to win both the Dudley Hewitt Cup as Central Canadian Champions and the 2004 Royal Bank Cup as National Champions.

Changes
Huntsville Wildcats fold mid-season.
Peterborough Bees change name to Peterborough Stars.
Milton Merchants change name to Milton Icehawks.
Hamilton Kiltys change name to Hamilton Red Wings

Final standings

Note: GP = Games played; W = Wins; L = Losses; OTL = Overtime losses; SL = Shootout losses; GF = Goals for; GA = Goals against; PTS = Points; x = clinched playoff berth; y = clinched division title; z = clinched conference title

2003-04 Frank L. Buckland Trophy Playoffs

Divisional Quarter-final
Wellington Dukes defeated Peterborough Stars 4-games-to-1
Bowmanville Eagles defeated Syracuse Jr. Crunch 4-games-to-none
Cobourg Cougars defeated Bancroft Hawks 4-games-to-3
Kingston Voyageurs defeated Trenton Sting 4-games-to-1
Aurora Tigers defeated Lindsay Muskies 4-games-to-none
Newmarket Hurricanes defeated Pickering Panthers 4-games-to-none
Stouffville Spirit defeated Thornhill Rattlers 4-games-to-2
Collingwood Blues defeated Oshawa Legionaires 4-games-to-none
Georgetown Raiders defeated Bramalea Blues 4-games-to-none
Hamilton Red Wings defeated Streetsville Derbys 4-games-to-none
Oakville Blades defeated Burlington Cougars 4-games-to-none
Milton Icehawks defeated Mississauga Chargers 4-games-to-1
St. Michael's Buzzers defeated Buffalo Lightning 4-games-to-none
Wexford Raiders defeated Ajax Axemen 4-games-to-none
North York Rangers defeated Vaughan Vipers 4-games-to-none
Markham Waxers defeated Couchiching Terriers 4-games-to-none

Divisional Semi-final
Wellington Dukes defeated Kingston Voyageurs 4-games-to-3
Bowmanville Eagles defeated Cobourg Cougars 4-games-to-none
Aurora Tigers defeated Collingwood Blues 4-games-to-none
Newmarket Hurricanes defeated Stouffville Spirit 4-games-to-1
Georgetown Raiders defeated Milton Icehawks 4-games-to-none
Oakville Blades defeated Hamilton Red Wings 4-games to-2
St. Michael's Buzzers defeated Markham Waxers 4-games-to-none
North York Rangers defeated Wexford Raiders 4-games-to-2

Divisional Final
Bowmanville Eagles defeated Wellington Dukes 4-games-to-3
Aurora Tigers defeated Newmarket Hurricanes 4-games-to-none
Oakville Blades defeated Georgetown Raiders 4-games-to-1
St. Michael's Buzzers defeated North York Rangers 4-games-to-1

Semi-final
St. Michael's Buzzers defeated Bowmanville Eagles 4-games-to-2
Aurora Tigers defeated Oakville Blades 4-games-to-2
Final
Aurora Tigers defeated St. Michael's Buzzers 4-games-to-2

Dudley Hewitt Cup Championship
Hosted by North Bay Skyhawks in North Bay, Ontario.  Aurora Tigers won the event.

Round Robin
Aurora Tigers defeated Soo Thunderbirds (NOJHL) 3-1
Aurora Tigers defeated Fort William North Stars (SIJHL) 4-0
Aurora Tigers defeated North Bay Skyhawks (NOJHL) 5-1
Final
Aurora Tigers defeated North Bay Skyhawks (NOJHL) 5-1

2004 Royal Bank Cup Championship
Hosted by Grande Prairie Storm in Grande Prairie, Alberta.  Aurora Tigers won the event.

Round Robin
Grande Prairie Storm (AJHL) defeated Aurora Tigers 4-2
Aurora Tigers defeated Nanaimo Clippers (BCHL) 4-2
Aurora Tigers defeated Kindersley Klippers (SJHL) 5-0
Aurora Tigers defeated Nepean Raiders (CJHL) 3-1
Semi-final
Aurora Tigers defeated Nepean Raiders (CJHL) 7-2
Final
Aurora Tigers defeated Kindersley Klippers (SJHL) 7-1

Players selected in 2004 NHL Entry Draft
Rd 7 #201  Michael Vernace - San Jose Sharks (Bramalea Blues)

See also
 2004 Royal Bank Cup
 Dudley Hewitt Cup
 List of OJHL seasons
 Northern Ontario Junior Hockey League
 Superior International Junior Hockey League
 Greater Ontario Junior Hockey League
 2003 in ice hockey
 2004 in ice hockey

References

External links
 Official website of the Ontario Junior Hockey League
 Official website of the Canadian Junior Hockey League

Ontario Junior Hockey League seasons
OPJHL